Jinji may refer to:
 Bap (food) for the elderly
 Jinji of Silla, 25th monarch of the ancient Korean kingdom of Silla
 Gingee, town in Tamil Nadu, India
 Gingee Fort, fort in Gingee

China 
(in Taiwan) Mandarin lemon
 Jinji Expressway (津蓟高速公路), an expressway running entirely within Tianjin
Towns
 Jinji, Tianchang (金集镇), Anhui
 Jinji, Zhong County (金鸡镇), in Zhong County, Chongqing
 Jinji, Qingshui County (金集镇), in Qingshui County, Gansu
 Jinji, Kaiping (金鸡镇), Guangdong
 Jinji, Luoding (金鸡镇), Guangdong
 Jinji, Teng County (金鸡镇), Guangxi